Joseph John Pagliarulo (born August 1, 1966), also known on the air as Joe Pags, is an American nationally syndicated conservative television and radio talk show host.

Biography
Born in Amityville, New York, Pagliarulo later lived in nearby Copiague, moved to  Lake Worth, Florida at age seven, and graduated from Santaluces Community High School. By 1988, Pagliarulo became a store president with Domino's Pizza.

Pagliarulo began his radio career in 1989 in Palm Beach County, Florida, then worked primarily in television news, serving in many roles and eventually as the main anchor at WEYI-TV in Saginaw/Flint, Michigan (1994–1996), morning and noon anchor at WWMT in Kalamazoo/Grand Rapids, Michigan (1996–1997), main anchor, managing editor and eventually news director at WLAJ in Lansing/Jackson, Michigan (1997–2002) and main anchor at WRGB in Schenectady, New York (2002–2005). During and after his time at WRGB he also served as talk show host at WHAM in Rochester, New York and WXDX (now WDTW) in Detroit, Michigan.

In 2005, Pagliarulo transitioned to talk radio and began his daily talk show that was first heard on iHeartMedia's flagship talk radio station WOAI 1200 in San Antonio, Texas as well as KPRC-Houston, KEX-Portland, KHOW-Denver, and KTLK-Minneapolis.  After Andy Dean's departure from America Now in 2014, Pagliarulo's daily show titled The Joe Pags Show was broadcast to approximately 130 America Now affiliates for almost a year until a full-time replacement host was selected.  After the America Now fill-in period ended, Pagliarulo's show began its own syndication through Compass Media Networks, and is heard on over 160 stations as of August 2022.<ref name=  His daily show is broadcast live from 6-9 PM Eastern Time and on tape delay in some of his syndicated markets.  He also hosted a weekend nationally syndicated radio talk show through Premiere Networks titled The Weekend with Joe Pags which he stepped down from in 2022.

Pagliarulo has made many appearances on Fox News, CNN, and MSNBC and previously served as a long-time frequent fill-in for Glenn Beck on Beck's television and radio programs.  He has won multiple broadcasting awards from the Associated Press, and his show is listed in the top 25 of Talkers Magazine's "Heavy Hundred" and has been named by Newsmax as one of the most influential talk shows in the country.

Personal life
Pagliarulo and his wife Jenny live in Texas with their five daughters, one of whom was adopted from China.

In May 2011, Pagliarulo underwent surgery for testicular cancer and has since reported a complete recovery.

On September 2, 2016, Pagliarulo reported that his daughter had been missing since August 31.  His request for help was spread across news and social media sites including Facebook and Twitter, and she was recovered unhurt the next day in Mexico accompanied by a 29-year-old male who was arrested on multiple charges. Pagliarulo promised on-air to assist with other missing and exploited persons, and has since given missing person reports and alerts with the assistance of various missing person agencies as part of his talk show.

References

External links 
 Official Web Site

1966 births
Living people
American radio personalities
American people of Italian descent
People from Amityville, New York
People from Comal County, Texas
People from Lake Worth Beach, Florida
American conservative talk radio hosts
Television personalities from Texas
Television personalities from Florida